United Nations Security Council Resolution 236, adopted on June 11, 1967, after noting the oral reports of the Secretary-General, the Council condemned any violations of the cease-fire called for in resolution 234.  The Council requested that the Secretary-General continue his investigations and report back as soon as possible and affirmed its demand for a cease-fire.  The Council called for the prompt return to the cease-fire positions of any troops which may have moved forward subsequent to 16:30 hours GMT on June 10, 1967, and called for the full co-operation with the Chief of Staff of the United Nations Truce Supervision Organization and the observers in implementing the cease-fire.

The meeting, requested by Syria, adopted resolution 236 unanimously.

See also
List of United Nations Security Council Resolutions 201 to 300 (1965–1971)
Six-Day War

References

External links
 
Text of the Resolution at undocs.org

 0236
Six-Day War
Israeli–Palestinian conflict and the United Nations
 0236
June 1967 events